Massapequa is a station on the Babylon Branch of the Long Island Rail Road in Massapequa, New York. It is officially located on Sunrise Highway east of Broadway and NY 107 and parking lots are located far beyond its given location. The station serves the Babylon Branch, which leads to the Montauk Branch.

History

Early history
Massapequa station is typical of the elevated Babylon Branch stations that were rebuilt during the mid-to-late 20th century. It was originally built by the South Side Railroad of Long Island on October 28, 1867 as South Oyster Bay station, until May 1889. The second relocated depot was built May–June 1891, and razed in January 1953 as part of the grade elimination project of the post-war era. A temporary station was relocated west of the former location on January 12, 1953, and the current elevated structure entered service between December 14–18, 1953.

Recent improvements

Platform rehabilitation project
In Spring 2013 the LIRR began work on the Massapequa Station Platform Rehabilitation Project, to replace the station's aging platform structure, platform canopy, elevator, escalator, platform waiting room, and the pedestrian bridge over Broadway. The project was estimated to cost the MTA $20 million, and was completed in the Summer of 2015.

Pocket track

The LIRR is installing a pocket track east of the Massapequa station.  The pocket track, which will be used for turning trains that begin or end their trips at Massapequa Station, would be installed east of the station, in the middle of the two Babylon Branch tracks that are platform-width apart at this point.

The project is expected to cost $19.6 million. Construction of the pocket track began in 2014. As of September 2015, a signal gantry frame was erected at the East end of the newly completed platform, and the tracks and ties for the pocket track along with switches had been installed in the ballast. The project was originally projected to be completed by November 2015, though was delayed until April 2019; it would eventually be completed in 2021.

Station layout
The station has one 12-car-long high-level island platform between the two tracks. It is the only Babylon Branch station that does not sit atop a concrete viaduct; instead it sits on top of a grassy embankment similar to Westbury.

References

External links 

South Oyster Bay-Massapequa Station (Arrt's Arrchives)
 Broadway entrance from Google Maps Street View
 Station House from Google Maps Street View

Oyster Bay (town), New York
Long Island Rail Road stations in Nassau County, New York
Railway stations in the United States opened in 1867
1867 establishments in New York (state)